Peter "Chuck" Badie (born May 17, 1925) is an American jazz bass player.
 
Badie was born in New Orleans in May 1925. His father was a prominent jazz saxophone player who played with the "Eureka" and the "Original Olympia" brass bands. He left the Navy in 1945, and then used the G.I. Bill to enrol at the Grunewald School of Music. From around 1950 he played with singer Roy Brown for two years. He then "worked with the singer Paul Gayten and Dave Bartholomew, then from 1954 to 1956 was a member of Lionel Hampton's orchestra."

He played double bass on some famous New Orleans rhythm-and-blues recordings. He worked with Hank Crawford, Edward Frank, June Gardner, Dizzy Gillespie, and Zoot Sims, but had to stop playing in the 1970s because of stomach problems. He returned to frequent playing in the 1990s, as part of Dr. John's band.

Badie was honored at the New Orleans Jazz Museum in February 2020 for 72 years in the music business.

References

1925 births
Living people
20th-century American bass guitarists
20th-century American male musicians
American jazz bass guitarists
American male bass guitarists
American male jazz musicians
Military personnel from Louisiana
Musicians from New Orleans
United States Navy personnel of World War II